George Hone Hone-Goldney (24 January 1851 – 28 March 1921) was an English lawyer and cricketer who played in two first-class cricket matches for Cambridge University in 1873 and a single match for an amateur side in 1876. He was born in Southborough, Kent and died at Winchester, Hampshire.

Hone-Goldney was a right-handed lower-order batsman and a right-arm medium pace bowler. He played in a lot of minor matches at Cambridge, but had appeared in only one first-class game when picked for the University match in 1873: in this game, he batted at No 11 and bowled only two overs, without success. He made a similarly scant impression in his third and final first-class match in 1876, though the game itself, between a team called The Gentlemen of the Marylebone Cricket Club and Kent, was rendered notable by the feat of W. G. Grace in scoring 344, the highest first-class score to that point and the first innings of more than 300.

Family, name and career
Hone-Goldney was educated at Eton College and at Trinity Hall, Cambridge. He was a lawyer admitted to the Inner Temple in 1873 and called to the bar in 1877; he practised on the Oxford circuit.

His name throughout his adult life was "Hone-Goldney". His father, George Goldney, who also played some first-class cricket at Cambridge, at some point hyphenated his middle and family names and became known as "George Hone-Goldney"; this happened after George Hone Hone-Goldney's birth (hence the strange dittograph in his name) but before the son's arrival at Cambridge.

References

1851 births
1921 deaths
People from Southborough, Kent
English cricketers
Cambridge University cricketers
People educated at Eton College
Alumni of Trinity Hall, Cambridge
Gentlemen of Marylebone Cricket Club cricketers
English barristers